Ripley railway station was a railway station which served the town of Ripley in Derbyshire, England. It was opened in 1856 by the Midland Railway on its Ripley branch from Little Eaton Junction, approximately 3 miles north of Derby. In 1890 it became the terminus of a line  from Heanor Junction on the Erewash Valley Line  near  Langley Mill.

Approximately two and a half miles from Denby  the line crossed the main Ripley Road at Marehay and reached the original station immediately to the south of Peasehill Road, around 1 km south of the town centre.

In 1889 a new line was built from Langley Mill through Heanor and Crosshill. A new station was built nearer to the town centre since it was planned to extend the line to meet the Ambergate to Pye Bridge Line at Butterley. The original station became known as the Old Yard and provided goods facilities.

The new station, to the south of Nottingham Road and in a deep cutting, was double tracked with two platforms provided with matching single storey buildings.

In the Grouping of all lines (into four main companies) in 1923 the station  became part of the London, Midland and Scottish Railway . The station closed to passengers in 1930, though it continued with a very lively goods trade for the town's shops and businesses. There were also regular excursions, for instance to the FA Cup Final organised by the Miners Welfare, and the annual week at the holiday camp at Skegness, taken by over a thousand miners and their families. On 12 October 1961 the station featured on the ITV programme Lunchbox.  Midland Railway Number 1000 brought 500 spectators from Derby.

The line north of Ripley to Butterley had closed on 23 January 1938. That going north from Marehay Junction closed in 1954 along with the Old Yard. The station finally closed to goods on 1 April 1963.

The station buildings were finally demolished around 1985 and part of the site was occupied by a builders merchant's warehouse.

Stationmasters

William Rich until 1861
W. Bevers 1861 - 1863
J. Ashton from 1863  
Joseph Hudson ca. 1869 - 1874
G. Tamblin 1874 - 1879
William Grundy 1879 - 1884
E.R. Brown 1884 - 1893
H. King 1893 - 1894
William F. Foster 1894 -  1924
Harry FInch 1924 - 1931 (afterwards station master at Wigston)
Richard Pratt 1931 - ca. 1945 (formerly station master at Whitwell
Mr. Knight ca. 1956

References

Buildings and structures demolished in 1985
Disused railway stations in Derbyshire
Former Midland Railway stations
Railway stations in Great Britain opened in 1856
Railway stations in Great Britain closed in 1930